Limestone County is the name of two counties in the United States:

 Limestone County, Alabama 
 Limestone County, Texas